Ulad may refer to:
 3-dehydro-L-gulonate-6-phosphate decarboxylase, an enzyme
 Ulaid, a people of early Ireland